James Shuler (May 29, 1959 – March 17, 1986) was a U.S. Olympic and professional boxer from Philadelphia known as "Black Gold."

Amateur career
Shuler was trained by Joe Frazier.

Shuler was the 1979 and 1980 National Golden Gloves Light Middleweight Champion. He qualified at 156 pounds and was a member of the 1980 U.S. Olympic boxing team that perished in an air crash in Warsaw, Poland, on March 14, 1980.  Shuler was not with the team, however, as he had stayed in America due to injury.  The team was en route to Warsaw, Poland for the USA vs. Poland Box-off as part of "USA vs. the World." event.  Among the USA Boxing teammates who were killed in the plane crash were Lemuel Steeples from St. Louis; Calvin Anderson from Connecticut; Paul Palomino - the brother of Carlos Palomino ; George Pimentel, and Olympic Coach, Sarge Johnson. Members of the team who were also not aboard included Bobby Czyz and Alex Ramos .

Shuler did not participate in the 1980 Olympics due to the boycott. In 2007, he posthumously received one of 461 Congressional Gold Medals created especially for the spurned athletes.

Highlights

 National Golden Gloves (156 lbs), Indianapolis, Indiana, March 1979:
1/2: Defeated Alfred Mayes by decision
Finals: Defeated Randy Smith by decision
Pan Am Trials (156 lbs), Toledo, Ohio, May–June 1979:
1/2: Defeated James Rayford by decision
Finals: Defeated Alfred Mayes by decision
 Pan American Games (156 lbs), San Juan, Puerto Rico, July 1979:
1/4: Defeated Luis Felipe Martínez (Cuba) by split decision, 3–2
1/2: Defeated Jorge Amparo (Dominican Republic) by decision
Finals: Lost to José Molina (Puerto Rico) RSC 2
 World Cup (156 lbs), New York City, October 1979:
1/4: Defeated Jim Spencer (Australia) by unanimous decision, 5–0
1/2: Defeated Khamzat Dzhabrailov (Soviet Union) by unanimous decision, 5–0
Finals: Defeated Park Il Chun (South Korea) by unanimous decision, 5–0

Frazier–Ali teams match-up (156 lbs) Houston, Texas, February 1980:
Lost to Jeff Stoudemire by decision
 National Golden Gloves (156 lbs), Hirsch Memorial Coliseum, Shreveport, Louisiana, March 1980:
1/8: Defeated Shane Hoose by decision
1/4: Defeated Roy Sapp by decision
1/2: Defeated Charles Garner RSC 2
Finals: Defeated Donald Bowers by decision
Olympic Trials (156 lbs), Atlanta, Georgia, June 1980:
1/4: Defeated Alfred Mayes by unanimous decision, 5–0
1/2: Defeated Donald Bowers by decision
Finals: Defeated Kenneth Styles RSC 2 
USA–USSR Duals (156 lbs), Showboat Hotel, Las Vegas, Nevada, January 1977:
Lost to Alexander Koshkin (Soviet Union) KO 1 

Shuler finished his amateur career with a record of 165–8.

Professional career
Shuler began his professional boxing career as a middleweight on September 12, 1980, with a second-round knockout of Chris Rogers in Philadelphia. During his five years as a pro, he won the NABF, national Middleweight championship with a win over Sugar Ray Seales. He had a 22–1 record with sixteen knockouts. His first and only professional loss came on March 10, 1986, to Thomas Hearns when he was knocked out in the first round.

Death
Shuler died in a motorcycle accident in Philadelphia on 17 March 1986, just one week after his last fight.

Memory and tribute
Bob Arum, the promoter of Shuler's last fight, said that the boxer came to Arum's room a day after the Hearns fight and thanked him for promoting it. Arum, who had promoted many bouts, said that Shuler was the only fighter who had ever done that, adding, "He was a decent, decent young man."

In 1995, his close friend Percy Custus opened the 'James Shuler Memorial Boxing Gym' in Shuler's native Philadelphia in honor of the fallen fighter. Custus met Shuler in the 1970s at the Joe Frazier Gym where they trained together and remained close friends for the rest of James’ life.

Professional boxing record

|-
| style="text-align:center;" colspan="8"|22 Wins (16 knockouts, 6 decisions), 1 Loss (1 knockout) 
|-  style="text-align:center; background:#e3e3e3;"
|  style="border-style:none none solid solid; "|Result
|  style="border-style:none none solid solid; "|Opp Record
|  style="border-style:none none solid solid; "|Opponent
|  style="border-style:none none solid solid; "|Type
|  style="border-style:none none solid solid; "|Round
|  style="border-style:none none solid solid; "|Date
|  style="border-style:none none solid solid; "|Location
|  style="border-style:none none solid solid; "|Notes
|-
|Loss
|
|align=left| Thomas Hearns
|KO
|1
|10/03/1986
|align=left| Caesars Palace, Las Vegas, Nevada
|align=left|
|-
|Win
|
|align=left| Jerry Holly
|UD
|10
|04/07/1985
|align=left| Resorts Casino Hotel, Atlantic City, New Jersey
|align=left|
|-
|Win
|
|align=left| James Kinchen
|SD
|12
|16/02/1985
|align=left| The Sands, Atlantic City, New Jersey
|align=left|
|-
|Win
|
|align=left| Kenny Bristol
|UD
|10
|25/02/1984
|align=left| Resorts Casino Hotel, Atlantic City, New Jersey
|align=left|
|-
|Win
|
|align=left| Clint Jackson
|PTS
|12
|17/01/1984
|align=left| Pennsylvania Hall, Philadelphia, Pennsylvania
|align=left|
|-
|Win
|
|align=left| Leroy Green, Jr.
|KO
|1
|25/11/1983
|align=left| Pacific Coliseum, Vancouver, British Columbia
|align=left|
|-
|Win
|
|align=left| Wilbur Henderson
|KO
|3
|28/09/1983
|align=left| Scranton, Pennsylvania
|align=left|
|-
|Win
|
|align=left| Norberto Sabater
|KO
|2
|17/09/1983
|align=left| The Sands, Atlantic City, New Jersey
|align=left|
|-
|Win
|
|align=left| Wilfredo Acosta
|KO
|1
|14/06/1983
|align=left| Philadelphia Civic Center, Philadelphia, Pennsylvania
|align=left|
|-
|Win
|
|align=left| Inocencio De la Rosa
|KO
|4
|18/03/1983
|align=left| Atlantic City Convention Center, Atlantic City, New Jersey
|align=left|
|-
|Win
|
|align=left| Ray Seales
|UD
|12
|23/10/1982
|align=left| Great Gorge Resort, McAfee, New Jersey
|align=left|
|-
|Win
|
|align=left| Dario De Asa
|KO
|2
|18/09/1982
|align=left| The Sands, Atlantic City, New Jersey
|align=left|
|-
|Win
|
|align=left| Collin Keller
|KO
|2
|12/06/1982
|align=left| Playboy Hotel and Casino, Atlantic City, New Jersey
|align=left|
|-
|Win
|
|align=left| Ricky Sheppard
|KO
|4
|11/04/1982
|align=left| Playboy Hotel and Casino, Atlantic City, New Jersey
|align=left|
|-
|Win
|
|align=left| Jesus Castro
|KO
|4
|13/02/1982
|align=left| Playboy Hotel and Casino, Atlantic City, New Jersey
|align=left|
|-
|Win
|
|align=left| Wyatt Simpkins
|KO
|4
|07/11/1981
|align=left| Playboy Hotel and Casino, Atlantic City, New Jersey
|align=left|
|-
|Win
|
|align=left| Kenny Hodges
|KO
|3
|18/07/1981
|align=left| Imperial Palace Hotel and Casino, Las Vegas, Nevada
|align=left|
|-
|Win
|
|align=left| Willard Nance
|KO
|4
|17/06/1981
|align=left| Martin Luther King Arena, Philadelphia, Pennsylvania
|align=left|
|-
|Win
|
|align=left|Vincent Evans
|TKO
|1
|11/04/1981
|align=left| Concord Resort Hotel, Kiamesha Lake, New York
|align=left|
|-
|Win
|
|align=left| Robert Gregory Dean Thomas
|TKO
|5
|28/03/1981
|align=left| Resorts Casino Hotel, Atlantic City, New Jersey
|align=left|
|-
|Win
|
|align=left| Charlie Hecker
|TKO
|3
|28/11/1980
|align=left| Felt Forum, New York City
|align=left|
|-
|Win
|
|align=left| Jamal Arbubakar
|UD
|4
|10/10/1980
|align=left| Felt Forum, New York City
|align=left|
|-
|Win
|
|align=left| Chris Rogers
|TKO
|2
|12/09/1980
|align=left| Felt Forum, New York City
|align=left|
|}

References

External links
 

1959 births
1986 deaths
African-American boxers
Welterweight boxers
Middleweight boxers
National Golden Gloves champions
American male boxers
Boxers at the 1979 Pan American Games
Pan American Games silver medalists for the United States
Pan American Games medalists in boxing
Congressional Gold Medal recipients
Road incident deaths in Pennsylvania
Motorcycle road incident deaths
Boxers from Philadelphia
Medalists at the 1979 Pan American Games
20th-century African-American sportspeople